Don't Be Afraid may refer to:

 Don't Be Afraid (album), by Information Society, 1997
 Don't Be Afraid (film), a 2011 Spanish film
 Don't Be Afraid, a 1999 novel by Malorie Blackman
 Don't Be Afraid, an organisation representing Catholic Church sexual abuse victims in Poland

Songs
 "Don't Be Afraid" (Aaron Hall song), 1992
 "Don't Be Afraid" (TKA song), 1988
 "Don't Be Afraid", by Boston from Don't Look Back, 1978
 "Don't Be Afraid", by Danzig from Blackacidevil, 2000 reissue
 "Don't Be Afraid", by Diplo and Damian Lazarus featuring Jungle, 2021
 "Don't Be Afraid", by L'Arc-en-Ciel, 2016
 "Don't Be Afraid", by the Spooks, 2003
 "Don't Be Afraid", by Stereomud from Perfect Self, 2001
 "Don't Be Afraid", from the musical Happy End, 1929
 "Don't Be Afraid", from the TV series Shining Time Station, 1989